The 1954 season was Dinamo București's sixth season in Divizia A. For the first time, Dinamo reaches the final of Romanian Cup, but loses to Metalul Reşiţa. In Divizia A, Dinamo ends third, behind champions Flacăra Roşie and CCA. For the third year in a row, the goalscorer of Divizia A is a Dinamo player. Alexandru Ene scored 20 goals out of 62 of the entire team.

Results

Romanian Cup final

Squad 

Standard team: Florea Birtașu – Iosif Szökő, Ladislau Băcuț – Gheorghe Băcuț, Valeriu Călinoiu, Gheorghe Toma – Carol Bartha, Ion Suru, Dumitru Nicolae, Titus Ozon, Alexandru Ene.

Transfers 

Dinamo makes significant changes in the squad again. It is brought goalkeeper Florea Birtașu free of contract after the disband of Casei Armatei Câmpulung Moldovenesc. From Dinamo Oraşul Stalin are brought Valeriu Neagu and Alexandru Ene, while Joseph Fuleiter was transferred from Flamura Rosie Arad. Constantin Marinescu and Nicolae Voinescu go to newly promoted Metalul Hunedoara.

References 
 www.labtof.ro
 Cupa României din 1954 - statistics

1954
Association football clubs 1954 season
1953–54 in Romanian football
1954–55 in Romanian football